Normal diplomatic relations were established between the Republic of Turkey and the United States of America in 1927. Relations after World War II evolved from the Second Cairo Conference in December 1943 and Turkey's entrance into World War II on the side of the Allies in February 1945. Later that year, Turkey became a charter member of the United Nations. Difficulties faced by Greece after the war in quelling a communist rebellion, along with demands by the Soviet Union for military bases in the Turkish Straits, prompted the United States to declare the Truman Doctrine in 1947. The doctrine declared American intentions to guarantee the security of Turkey and Greece, and resulted in significant U.S. military and economic support. This support manifested in the establishment of a clandestine stay-behind army, denoted the "Counter-Guerrilla", under Operation Gladio. After participating with United Nations forces in the Korean War, Turkey joined the North Atlantic Treaty Organization in 1952.

Relations between the countries began to deteriorate in 2003 as Turkey refused to allow the United States to use Incirlik Air Base for the invasion of Iraq, a process that intensified following the coup d'état attempt in Turkey in July 2016 as the country's foreign policy gradually shifted towards seeking partnerships with other powers such as Russia, as well as the dispute over the Armenian genocide, which the United States recognized in 2021.

A 2019 survey conducted by the Pew Research Center showed 73% of Turks had a negative view of the United States, with only 20% having a positive view, the lowest among countries polled. The same study also showed only 11% of Turks had confidence in the US leader at the time of the survey, President Donald Trump, with 84% having no confidence in him.

Country comparison

Leaders of the Republic of Turkey and the United States of America from 1923

Strategic partnership
The strategic partnership characterizes the exceptionally close economic and military relations between the two countries, particularly for relations since 1952. The United States actively supported Turkey's membership bid to join the European Union and frequently lobbied on behalf of Ankara through its diplomatic missions in EU capital cities.

Cold War (1946–91) 
From 1952 to 1991 the relationship premised upon the concept of a “mutuality of benefits”.

War on Terror (Afghanistan - Iraq - Syria) 
In 2001, the relationship began with the premise of the United States' fostering cooperation on counterterrorism, law enforcement, and military training and education. Turkey remained a close ally of the United States and provided support in the War on Terror.

Dissociation of partnership 

According to The Economist, in October 2017, Turkish-American relations sank to their lowest in over 40 years. Since US President Barack Obama mediated tensions between Turkish President Recep Tayyip Erdoğan and Israeli Prime Minister Benjamin Netanyahu over the Gaza flotilla raid, some neoconservatives have called for Turkey's expulsion from NATO. Tom Rogan from National Review promoted expelling Turkey from NATO as part of his broader efforts to reform the alliance. Ted Galen Carpenter, a senior fellow in defense and foreign policy studies at the Cato Institute, also proposed expelling Turkey from the Western alliance. Tensions have risen over issues like the US arming the People's Protection Units (which is related with the anti-Turkish government group Kurdistan Workers' Party), in 2015 while claiming Turkey turned a blind eye to ISIL and other jihadist networks on both sides of its border. Turkey performed the January 2014 Turkish airstrike in Syria. Five months later, the US-led Operation Inherent Resolve against ISIL on 15 June 2014. The belief among most Turkish citizens that America had a hand in the 2016 Turkish coup d'état attempt which was compounded by the fact that its suspected ringleader, the Islamic preacher Hoca Fethullah Gülen, lives in Pennsylvania. Shortly after the FETÖ's (the Gulen movement) purges and arrests in the country, on October 4, 2016, Turkey moved to arrest Turkish nationals employed at American consulates (Metin Topuz on espionage and conspiracy charges), followed on the October 7, 2016, arrest of pastor and teaching elder Evangelical Presbyterian Andrew Brunson. Over 160,000 judges, teachers, police and civil servants suspended or dismissed, together with about 77,000 formally arrested. On October 10, 2016, in regards to John R. Bass, Turkey declared: “We do not consider the ambassador a representative of the United States” which was a step short of being an unwanted person. On May 16, 2017 clashes at the Turkish Ambassador's Residence in Washington, D.C. Since the deterioration of the relationship, there has been growing Turkish-Russian security cooperation.

Relations deteriorated following passage of the National Defense Congressional Initiatives Plan (NDAA, P.L. 115-232) by the 115th Congress-which included an amendment added by Senator John McCain requiring the Trump Administration to submit a detailed report to Congress on the status of US–Turkey relations. The Department of Defense (DOD) submitted a mostly classified report to Congress in November 2018 and the following appropriations legislation proposed for FY2019 in the 116th Congress (H.R. 648) required the DOD report on the issue. From October 9 to October 17, the 2019 Turkish offensive into north-eastern Syria established the Second Northern Syria Buffer Zone. US lost trust in Turkey as the latter bombed its own military base at the Northern Syria Buffer Zone. On February 5, 2020, the US halted a secretive military intelligence cooperation program with Turkey against the Kurdistan Workers' Party (PKK), which was listed as a terrorist organization by the US and Turkey. Turkey had observation posts in the Idlib demilitarization (2018–2019) zone which held more than 3,000,000 internally displaced Syrians (more than half of them children). On February 27, 2020, Syrian forces attacked Turkish forces at the Idlib demilitarization (2018–2019) zone, and military separation between the forces became public after a senior US State Department official argued with the Pentagon over Turkey's request for two Patriot batteries on its southern border. The request was confirmed by Turkish Defense Minister Hulusi Akar.

Public relations

Opinion 
According to a survey conducted in the spring of 2017 and released in August, 72% of Turks see the United States as a threat to Turkey's security. Furthermore, the US was perceived as a greater threat to security than Russia or China. According to PBS, opinions of the US dropped steadily from 1999/2000 (52% in Turkey in 1999/2000) and in 2006, favorable opinions dropped significantly in predominantly Muslim countries, which ranged from 12% in Turkey to 30% in Indonesia and Egypt.

The following histogram shows the percentage of Turks that viewed the United States favorably according to the PEW Global Attitudes Survey:

Results of 2017 BBC World Service:

Lobbying & think tanks 

The Turkish lobby in the United States is a lobby that works on behalf of the Turkish government to promote the nation's interests with the US government. The Turkish Coalition of America (TCA) is an educational, congressional advocacy, and charitable organization which was incorporated in February 2007.

The Office of Defense Cooperation Turkey is a United States Security Assistance Organization working on issues related to Turkey.

Diplomacy 

The United States has sent many ambassadors to Turkey since October 12, 1927. Turkey has maintained many high-level contacts with United States.

History 

After 1780, the United States began relations with North African countries and the Ottoman Empire. In the early 1800s, the US fought the Barbary Wars against the Barbary states, which were under Ottoman suzerainty. The Ottomans severed diplomatic relations with the United States on April 20, 1917, after the United States declared war against Germany on April 4, 1917, due to the Ottoman–German alliance. Normal diplomatic relations were re-established with the Ottoman Empire's successor state, Turkey, in 1927.

Truman (1945–1953) 
The Truman Doctrine was an American foreign policy whose stated purpose was to counter Soviet geopolitical expansion during the Cold War. One of Turkey's most important international relationships has been with the United States since the end of the Second World War and the beginning of the Cold War. Turkey's began to associate with the United States in 1947 when the United States Congress designated Turkey, under the provisions of the "Truman Doctrine", as the recipient of special economic and military assistance intended to help it resist threats from the Soviet Union. In support of the US' overall Cold War strategy, Turkey contributed personnel to the United Nations forces in the Korean War (1950–53) and joined NATO in 1952. A mutual interest in containing Soviet expansion provided the foundation of US–Turkish relations for the next four decades.

Turkish Straits crisis 

At the conclusion of World War II, Turkey was pressured by the Soviet government to allow Russian shipping to pass freely through the Turkish Straits, which connected the Black Sea to the Mediterranean. As the Turkish government would not submit to the Soviet Union's requests, tensions arose in the region and led to a show of naval force from the Soviets. Since British assistance to Turkey had ended in 1947, the U.S. dispatched military aid to ensure that Turkey would retain chief control of the passage. Turkey received $111 million in economic and military aid and the U.S. sent the aircraft carrier Franklin D. Roosevelt.

In his reforms, Mustafa Kemal envisioned a party-based system however the term "de facto single-party state" is used to define this period as the dominant-party system (in this case, the Republican People's Party), and unlike the single-party state, allowed democratic multiparty elections, but existing practices effectively prevent the opposition from winning the elections. As a result of Soviet threats and U.S. assistance against them, Turkey moved away from a single-party elected government towards a multi-party electoral system and held the first multi-party elections in 1946. In 1950, President İsmet İnönü was defeated by the main opposition party led by Adnan Menderes, who was elected by popular vote.

The postwar period from 1946 started with a "multi-party period" and the Democratic Party government of Adnan Menderes.

Eisenhower Administration (1953–1961) 
 
Turkey was a founding member of the Central Treaty Organization (CENTO) collective defense pact established in 1955, and endorsed the principles of the 1957 Eisenhower Doctrine. In the 1950s and 1960s, Turkey generally cooperated with other United States allies in the Middle East (Iran, Israel, and Jordan) to contain the influence of countries (Egypt, Iraq, and Syria) regarded as Soviet clients. Throughout the Cold War, Turkey was the bulwark of NATO's southeastern flank and directly bordered Warsaw Pact countries.

Intelligence (U-2) 

On May 1, 1960, a U-2 spy plane was shot down by the Soviet Air Defence Forces while performing photographic aerial reconnaissance deep into Soviet territory. On April 28, 1960, a U.S. Lockheed U-2C spy plane, Article 358, was ferried from Incirlik Air Base in Turkey to the US base at Peshawar airport by pilot Glen Dunaway. Fuel for the aircraft had been ferried to Peshawar the previous day in a US Air Force C-124 transport. A US Air Force C-130 followed, which carried the ground crew, mission pilot Francis Powers, and backup pilot Bob Ericson. On the morning of April 29, the crew in Badaber was informed that the mission had been delayed by one day. As a result, Bob Ericson flew Article 358 back to Incirlik, and John Shinn ferried another U-2C, Article 360, from Incirlik to Peshawar. On 30 April, the mission was delayed one more day because of bad weather over the Soviet Union. On 1 May, Captain Powers left the base in Peshawar on a mission with the operations code word GRAND SLAM. Four days after Powers' disappearance, NASA issued a very detailed press release noting that an aircraft had "gone missing" north of Turkey.

On May 13 the Soviet Union sent complaints to Turkey, who in turn protested to the United States. Turkey acquired assurances that no U.S. aircraft would be allowed for unauthorized purposes.

Kennedy and Johnson administrations (1961–1969)

Cuban Missile Crisis 

Turkey risked nuclear war on its soil during the Cuban Missile Crisis. It was a 13-day confrontation between the United States and the Soviet Union initiated by the American discovery of Soviet ballistic missile deployment in Cuba. In response to the failed Bay of Pigs Invasion of 1961 and the presence of American Jupiter ballistic missiles in Italy and Turkey, Soviet leader Nikita Khrushchev agreed to Cuba's request to place nuclear missiles on the island to deter a future invasion. An agreement was reached between John F. Kennedy and Khrushchev. Publicly, the Soviets would dismantle their offensive weapons in Cuba, in exchange for a US public declaration and agreement to avoid invading Cuba again. Secretly, the United States agreed that it would dismantle all US-built Jupiter MRBMs, which had been deployed in Turkey and Italy against the Soviet Union.

In 2017, The Putin Interviews claimed that the placement of Russian missiles in Cuba was a Russian reaction to the earlier stationing of American missiles in Turkey in 1961–62; it was Khrushchev's attempt to achieve a balance of power.

Cyprus Emergency 

The Cyprus Emergency was a conflict fought in British Cyprus between 1955 and 1959. The National Organisation of Cypriot Fighters (EOKA), a Greek Cypriot right-wing nationalist guerrilla organisation, began an armed campaign in support of ending British colonial rule and enabling the unification of Cyprus and Greece (Enosis) in 1955. Opposition to Enosis from Turkish Cypriots led to the formation of the Turkish Resistance Organisation (TMT) in support of the partition of Cyprus. In the mid-1960s relations worsened between Greek and Turkish communities on Cyprus. Britain wanted to hand the crisis and a peacekeeping role to either NATO or UN forces. US President Lyndon B. Johnson tried to prevent a Turkish invasion of Cyprus and war between them. American diplomat George Ball found Archbishop Makarios, president of Cyprus, difficult to deal with, as he commonly rejected advice.

The Americans secretly talked to General Georgios Grivas, leader of the EOKA guerrilla organization. While invasion and war did not occur, the U.S. alienated both the Greek and Turkish governments and drove Makarios closer to the Russians and Egyptians. The Cyprus Emergency ended in 1959 with the signing of the London-Zürich Agreements, establishing the Republic of Cyprus as a non-partitioned independent state separate from Greece.

Nixon and Ford Administrations (1969–1977)

Turkish invasion of Cyprus

After the 1974 Cypriot coup d'état (backed by the Cypriot National Guard and the Greek military junta), on July 20, 1974, Turkey invaded Cyprus, claiming it was protecting the safety of Turkish Cypriots in accordance with the Treaty of Guarantee. The Turkish military occupied  the northern third of Cyprus, dividing the island along what became known as the Green Line monitored by the United Nations, defying ceasefire.

Turkey repeatedly claimed, for decades before the invasion and frequently afterward, that Cyprus was of vital strategic importance to it. Ankara defied a host of UN resolutions demanding the withdrawal of its occupying troops from the island. About 142,000 Greek Cypriots living in the north and 65,000 Turkish Cypriots living in the south, were forcibly expelled and are forbidden to return to their homes and properties. The United States imposed an arms embargo on Turkey in response and relations between the two countries suffered significantly. 109 Turkish villages were destroyed and 700 Turks were kept as hostages. Daily Telegraph described events as anti-Turkish pogrom.

Carter administration (1977–1981) 
The arms embargo was silently removed a few years later with the contribution of the geopolitical changes in the Middle East like the Iranian Revolution. National Security Advisor Zbigniew Brzezinski discussed with his staff about a possible American invasion of Iran by using Turkish bases and territory if the Soviets decided to repeat the Afghanistan scenario in Iran, although this plan did not materialize.

Reagan administration (1981–1989) 
During the 1980s, relations between Turkey and the United States gradually recovered. In March 1980 Turkey and the US signed the Defense and Economic Cooperation Agreement (DECA), in which the United States was granted access to 26 military facilities in return for Turkey's ability to buy modern military hardware and  $450 million. Although Ankara resented continued attempts by the United States Congress to restrict military assistance to Turkey because of Cyprus and the introduction of congressional resolutions condemning the Armenian genocide, the Özal government generally perceived the administration of President George H. W. Bush as sympathetic to Turkish interests. At this time, Turkish Aerospace Industries (TAI) was established and it started to build F-16 Fighting Falcon jets under licence in Turkey. Washington demonstrated its support of Özal's market-oriented economic policies and efforts to open the Turkish economy to international trade by pushing for acceptance of an International Monetary Fund program to provide economic assistance to Turkey. Furthermore, the United States, unlike European countries, did not persistently and publicly criticize Turkey over allegations of human rights violations, nor did it pressure Özal on the Kurdish problem. By 1989 the United States had recovered a generally positive image among the Turkish political elite.

George H. W. Bush administration (1989–1993)

The end of the Cold War forced Turkish leaders to reassess their country's international position. The disappearance of the Soviet threat and the perception of being excluded from Europe created a sense of vulnerability with respect to Turkey's position in the fast-changing global political environment. Turkey supported the Arab–Israeli peace process and expanded ties with the Central Asian members of the CIS. Özal believed Turkey's future security depended on the continuation of a strong relationship with the United States.

During the Gulf War, Özal modified the main principles of Turkish foreign policy towards the Middle East, which were non-interference in intra-Arab disputes and the Middle Eastern affairs. The role Turkey played during the Gulf War demonstrated to the public that it was one of the key actors in the region.

Iraq (Gulf War and Northern Safe Zone) 

President Özal supported the United States' position during the Gulf War (2 August 1990 – 17 January 1991). Turkey's economic ties to Iraq were extensive and their disruption hurt the country. Turkey lost approximately $60 billion by closing the Kirkuk–Ceyhan Oil Pipeline during the conflict. Just before the war, Chief of the Turkish General Staff General Necip Torumtay resigned out of disagreement in involving Turkish ground forces with the conflict, which prevented Turkey's active military engagement. Turkey allowed United Nations forces (UN SC Resolution 665) to fly missions from its air bases; by doing so Turkey remained a platform for the US attacks against Iraq for the rest of the conflict. Turkey played a role in the war by restraining a sizeable proportion of the Iraqi army on the Turkey–Iraq border.

After the war, Turkey continued to support major United States initiatives in the region, including the creation of a safe zone for Iraqi Kurds over northern Iraq. Turkey received heavy Iraqi Kurdish refugees following the 1991 uprisings in Iraq (1 March – 5 April 1991). The Iraqi no-fly zones were two no-fly zones (NFZs) that were proclaimed by the United States, United Kingdom, and France to create safe zones for the internally displaced people after the war. The US and the UK claimed authorization for the NFZ based on United Nations Security Council Resolution 688, though not in the text. The US stated that the NFZs were intended to protect the ethnic Kurdish minority in northern Iraq and Shiite Muslims in the south. Turkey opened its Incirlik and Diyarbakir air bases and became involved in the ground support and intelligence operations for the northern NFZ which was initially part of Operation Provide Comfort's relief operations before being succeeded by Operation Northern Watch.

NFZs also enabled a safe haven for PKK. Turkey performed cross-border operations into northern Iraq:

 Operation Northern Iraq: October 12 – November 1, 1992
 Operation Steel: March 20 – May 4, 1995
 Operation Hammer: May 12 – July 7, 1997
 Operation Dawn: September 25 – October 15, 1997

In September 1998, Masoud Barzani and Jalal Talabani signed the US-mediated Washington Agreement and established a formal peace treaty. In the agreement, the parties agreed to share revenue, share power, and deny the use of northern Iraq to the PKK. President Bill Clinton signed the Iraq Liberation Act into law, providing for military assistance to Iraqi opposition groups, which included the PUK and KDP.

The United States' use of Turkish military installations during the bombing of Iraq in 1991 led to anti-war demonstrations in several Turkish cities, and sporadic attacks on United States facilities in 1992 and 1993.

Clinton administration (1993–2001)
In January 1995, a consensus had emerged by among Turkey's political elite that the country's security depended on remaining a strategic ally of the United States. For that reason, both the Demirel and Çiller governments made efforts to cultivate relations with the administrations of presidents George H. W. Bush and Bill Clinton.

Syria (terrorism) 

Syria has been on the U.S. list of state sponsors of terrorism since the list's inception in 1979 and deems it to be a “safe haven” for terrorists. Turkey condemned Syria for supporting the Kurdistan Workers' Party (PKK), which is listed as a terrorist organization internationally by a number of states and organizations.

The Turkish government openly threatened Syria over its support for the PKK. Turkey claimed that Syria employed former Schutzstaffel officer Alois Brunner to train militants. Turkey and Syria nearly engaged in war when Turkey threatened military action if Syria continued to shelter Abdullah Öcalan in Damascus, his long-time safe haven. Öcalan was the leader and one of the founding members of the PKK. As a result, the Syrian government forced Öcalan to leave the country, who was captured in Kenya on February 15, 1999, while being transferred from the Greek embassy to Jomo Kenyatta International Airport in Nairobi, in an operation by the National Intelligence Organization (MIT) with the help of the CIA.

George W. Bush administration (2001–2009)

According to leaked diplomatic cables originating from 2004, then Prime Minister Erdoğan was described by U.S. diplomats as a "perfectionist workaholic who sincerely cares for the well-being of those around him". He was also described as having "little understanding of politics beyond Ankara" and as surrounding himself with an "iron ring of sycophantic (but contemptuous) advisors". He is said to be "isolated", and that his MPs and Ministers feel "fearful of Erdogan's wrath". Diplomats state that "he relies on his charisma, instincts, and the filterings of advisors who pull conspiracy theories off the Web or are lost in neo-Ottoman Islamist fantasies".

War on Terror 
Turkey had remained a close ally of the United States in the War on Terror after the September 11 attacks. Turkish President Ahmet Necdet Sezer and Prime Minister Bülent Ecevit condemned the attacks and the Turkish government then ordered all of its flags at half-mast for one day of mourning. Turkey participated in the International Security Assistance Force.

According to a report by the Open Society Foundations, Turkey participated at one point or another with the CIA's extraordinary rendition program.  U.S. ambassador Ross Wilson revealed the involvement of the Incirlik airbase in a diplomatic cable dated June 8, 2006, which described Turkey as a crucial ally in the "global war on terror" and an important logistical base for the US-led war in Iraq. On June 14, 2006, Turkish foreign ministry officials told reporters: "The Turkish government and state never played a part [in the secret transfers] ... and never will." According to evidence, the US base was a transit stop in taking detainees to secret prisons. The cable also stated: "We recommend that you do not raise this issue with TGS [Turkish general staff] pending clarification from Washington on what approach state/OSD/JCS/NSC [national security council] wish to take."

Iraq (territorial integrity) 
Turkey is particularly cautious about a Kurdish state arising from a destabilized Iraq. Turkey has fought an insurgent war against the PKK, which is listed as a terrorist organization internationally by a number of states and organizations. Iraq was a safe haven for PKK. The Iraqi Kurds were organized under the PUK and KDP, who later cooperated with American forces during the 2003 invasion of Iraq.

In 2002 Morton I. Abramowitz (1989–1991 US Ambassador) said, in regards to Turkey's involvement in an upcoming war: "It is hard to believe that in the end the Turks would not cooperate with the United States if war takes place, with or without UN blessing". Vice President Dick Cheney's only trip abroad in his first three years at the office was a four-day trip to Ankara. Prime Minister Bülent Ecevit welcomed Cheney to a working dinner on March 19, who offered $228 million to aid in military efforts provided that international military operations took command of the Afghanistan peacekeeping force. Turkey's position on Iraq was presented to Cheney. In December 2002, Turkey moved approximately 15,000 soldiers to its border with Iraq. The 2003 invasion of Iraq faced strong domestic opposition in Turkey: opinion polls showed that 80% of Turks were opposed to the war. The Turkish Parliament's position reflected the public's. The March 1, 2003, motion at the Turkish Parliament could not reach the absolute majority of 276 votes needed to allow US troops to attack Iraq from Turkey (62,000 troops and more than 250 planes), the final tally being 264 votes for and 250 against. BBC's Jonny Dymond said the knife-edge vote is a massive blow to the government which has a majority in parliament. On March 11, Abdullah Gul resigned as Turkey's Prime Minister. Chief of the General Staff of Turkey Hilmi Özkök said "Turkey would suffer the effects of the war [motion also included twice as many Turkish troops to be deployed to northern Iraq]."  The US did not immediately re-deploy the forces intended for staging in Turkey and the State Department asked for "clarification" of the Turkish vote. In the end, the US pulled the offer of $6 billion in grants and up to $24 billion in loan guarantees, which caused Turkey's stock market to plunge by 12%.

On March 20, the 2003 invasion of Iraq began. On July 4, 2003, Turkish military personnel that were stationed in northern Iraq were captured from their station, led away with hoods over their heads, and interrogated; this later came to be known as the "hood event". Turkish military personnel had stationed military observers in "northern safe zone" after the 1991 Gulf War. The specific unit was stationed at Sulaimaniya after the civil war broke out in 1996 to monitor a ceasefire between the PUK and KDP. The unit station was a historical Ottoman Empire facility (dwelling), which held the historical archives of the Ottoman Empire. Among the destroyed documents were the deed records of the region. The hood event was strongly condemned by the Turkey's newspapers and referred to Americans as "Rambos" and "Ugly Americans". Chief of the General Staff of Turkey Hilmi Özkök declared the incident as the sign of "crisis of confidence" between the US and Turkey.

During the conflict, Ankara pressured the U.S. into subduing PKK training camps in northern Iraq. The U.S. remained reluctant due to northern Iraq's relative stability compared to the rest of the country. On October 17, 2007, the Turkish Parliament voted in favor of allowing the Turkish Armed Forces to take military action against the PKK based in northern Iraq. In response, Bush stated that he did not believe it was in Turkey's interests to send troops into Iraq. Operation Sun was executed 21 – 29 February 2008.

Nuclear energy 
In June 2008, The United States and Turkey began to cooperate on peaceful uses of nuclear energy with a pact that aims for the transfer of technology, material, reactors, and components for nuclear research and nuclear power production in Turkey for an initial 15-year period followed by automatic renewals in five-year increments that provides a comprehensive framework for peaceful nuclear cooperation between the two nations under the agreed non-proliferation conditions and controls. A parallel US bipartisan resolution highlighted the importance of the Turkish Republic's key role in providing its western (EU and US) and regional allies Eurasian energy security.

The Center for Strategic and International Studies started a one-year initiative project to evaluate and enhance the Turkish Republic–United States strategic partnership, aiming for a plan of implementation of the concluded framework at the end of this phase.

Gülen movement (Ergenekon) 
The Gülen movement is a self-described transnational social movement based on moral values and advocacy of universal access to education, civil society, and tolerance and peace, inspired by the religious teachings of Sunni cleric (mufti) Fethullah Gülen, a Turkish Islamic preacher based in the United States. The conflict between the Turkish government the Gülen movement is a major Turkey–United States relations issue.

Gülen movement's possible involvement in the Ergenekon plot (trials) is controversial. The investigation claimed to study an organization compared to Counter-Guerrilla. Accused were claimed to be the "deep state." The Ergenekon trials were a series of high-profile trials that began on October 20, 2008, in which 275 people, including military officers, journalists, and opposition lawmakers, all alleged members of Ergenekon, were accused of plotting against the Erdogan government. The trials resulted in lengthy prison sentences for most of the accused. The US Secretary of State reported on the Turkish investigation into the Ergenekon network and concluded that “the details of the case were murky, however, and Ergenekon's status as a terrorist organisation remained under debate at year's end”.

Obama administration (2009–2017)

A U.S. Democratic Party delegation group including U.S. Senators Robert Casey, Edward E. Kaufman, Frank Lautenberg and U.S. Congressman Timothy Waltz met with Turkish officials in Ankara on 30 May to confirm that “Turkey can always depend on the US, while the US can always rely on its close friendship with Turkey”.

War on Terror 
The 2009 U.S. Secretary of State's Country Report on Terrorism confirmed that cooperation against terrorism is a key element in America's strategic partnership with Turkey, before going on to praise Turkish contributions to stabilize Iraq and Afghanistan and highlighting the strategic importance of the İncirlik Air Base used by both U.S. and NATO forces for operations in the region. Turkey had opposed the appointment of Anders Fogh Rasmussen as NATO secretary general due to his approach to the Muhammed carricaturs in Denmark until Obama assured a Turk would be one of Rasmussen deputies.

The U.S. Secretary of State's report also contained information on the PKK and other terrorist groups operating in Turkey, whom the U.S. and Turkish authorities share intelligence on, highlighting the September 12, 2006, attack on Diyarbakır and the July 27, 2008, attack on Güngören. In 2016, Vice President Joe Biden called the PKK a terrorist group "plain and simple" and compared it to the ISIL.

Israel (Gaza flotilla raid) 

The Gaza flotilla raid was a military operation by Israel against six civilian ships of the "Gaza Freedom Flotilla" on 31 May 2010 in international waters in the Mediterranean Sea. Israel–Turkey relations reached a low point after the incident. Turkey recalled its ambassador, canceled joint military exercises, and called for an emergency meeting of the UN Security Council. Erdoğan harshly referred to the raid as a "bloody massacre" and "state terrorism", and criticized Israel in a speech before the Grand National Assembly. The Turkish Grand National Assembly held a debate on whether to impose sanctions on Israel, and eventually came out with a statement criticizing the attack as illegal, demanding that Israel apologize, pay compensation, and prosecute those involved, while calling on the Turkish government to review ties with Israel and take "effective measures". The flotilla raid was among the issues discussed during a security meeting of Turkish military commanders chaired by Erdoğan.

Prior to a Gaza visit, scheduled for April 2013, Erdoğan explained to Turkish newspaper Hürriyet that three conditions needed to be fulfilled by Israel to resume friendly relations between the two nations: an apology for the raid, the awarding of compensation to the families affected by the raid, and the lifting of the Gaza blockade by Israel. President Obama intervened on the issue. On March 22, 2013, Netanyahu apologized for the incident in a 30-minute telephone call with Erdoğan, stating that the results were unintended; the Turkish prime minister accepted the apology and agreed to enter into discussions to resolve the compensation issue.

Iran (nuclear deal, arms embargo, oil trading controversy) 
In April 2010, Washington stepped up its efforts to impose a new round of sanctions on Iran over its nuclear program. Key powers such as Turkey, India and China opposed the adoption of a new round of sanctions against Tehran. As a result, the US Congress has delayed arms sales sought by the Turkish military. However, questions have been subsequently raised over the continued presence of US nuclear weapons being reportedly stationed at the air base during the Cold War as part of the NATO nuclear sharing program, after recent parliamentary debates in Belgium and Germany called for the removal of weapons stationed there under the same program. Bilkent University Professor Mustafa Kibaroğlu speculates that if the Obama administration presses for the withdrawal of these weapons, which Turkey wishes to maintain, then Turkey-U.S. relations may be strained.

A separate report presented to Obama by the U.S. Commission on International Religious Freedom, which had previously urged him to raise the subject of religious freedom during his 2009 presidential visit to Turkey, concluded that Turkey's interpretation of secularism “resulted in violations of religious freedoms for many of the country's citizens, including members of the majority and, especially, minority religious communities”. Obama said that future arms sales would depend on Turkish policies.

In March 2017, the deputy head Halkbank, Mehmet Hakan Atilla, was arrested by the US government for conspiring to evade sanctions against Iran by helping Reza Zarrab, an Iranian-Azeri businessman who had taken Turkish citizenship, "use U.S. financial institutions to engage in prohibited financial transactions that illegally funneled millions of dollars to Iran". Zarrab was in Miami, Florida, in March 2016.

Atilla's trial commenced in New York City federal court in November 2017, with Zarrab agreeing to testify after reaching a plea deal with prosecutors. In early 2018, Atilla was convicted on five of six counts against him, including bank fraud and conspiracies and acquitted on one count after four days of jury deliberation.

The Arab Spring (Turkish model) 
The U.S. under President Obama was reluctant to get deeply involved in the Arab World and was generally supportive of Turkish efforts in the region.

Syrian Civil War (territorial integrity, Rat Line) 

Turkey was particularly cautious about a Kurdish state arising from a destabilized Syria. Turkey has fought an insurgent war against the PKK, which is listed as a terrorist organization internationally by a number of states and organizations. Until 2011, Turkey's policy was trying to preserve a neutral but constructive position because civil war and sectarian conflicts would threaten Turkey's security. Eventually war broke and Syria (refugees, spillover) impacted Turkey more directly than other actors in the conflict.

Beginning in 2012, Turkey and the US supported the "Syrian opposition" which hold the idea of replacing the government and "holding accountable those responsible for killing Syrians, destroying [Syria], and displacing [Syrians]". In early 2012, Seymour Hersh reported that the CIA cooperated with Turkey in a covert operation named "the Rat Line", which obtained and transported armaments from Libya to rebel groups (later known as the Free Syrian Army (FSA)) in Syria via proxies and front organizations in southern Turkey. The CIA's involvement reportedly ended after the mass evacuation of CIA operatives from the American consulate in Benghazi, Libya, after the 2012 Benghazi attack. In January 2014, the House Permanent Select Committee on Intelligence reported specifically on "the CIA annex at Benghazi", that "all CIA activities in Benghazi were legal and authorized. On-the-record testimony establishes that the CIA was not sending weapons ... from Libya to Syria, or facilitating other organizations or states that were transferring weapons from Libya to Syria." While the Obama administration investigated the Benghazi attack in January 2014, the National Intelligence Organisation scandal in Turkey broke out. In May 2014, the editor-in-chief of the Cumhuriyet Can Dündar published pictures of agents and trucks, and was later sentenced for ″leaking secret information of the state″. In October 2014, Vice President Joe Biden accused Turkey of funding al-Nusra and al Qaeda (FSA-identified groups), to which Erdoğan angrily responded, "Biden has to apologize for his statements" adding that if no apology is made, Biden would become "history to [him]". Biden subsequently apologized. In 2015, the International Business Times wrote that the US sent weapons shipments to FSA-identified groups through a CIA program for years. Timber Sycamore was a classified weapons supply and training program run by the CIA and supported by some Arab intelligence services, such as the security service in Saudi Arabia. It launched in 2012 or 2013 and supplied money, weaponry and training to rebel forces. According to US officials, the program has trained thousands of rebels. In July 2017, H. R. McMaster, National Security Adviser to President Donald Trump and CIA Director Mike Pompeo, decided to terminate the program.

Some groups held the idea of "Syrian Balkanization" ("division of the country") in which they promoted federalizing Syria on ethnic and religious-sectarian lines. Obama used the "red line" on August 20, 2012, in relation to chemical weapons. On the one-year anniversary of Obama's red line speech, the Ghouta chemical attacks occurred. John McCain said the red line was "apparently written in disappearing ink," due to the perception the red line had been crossed with no action. At the same time, United States Central Command (CENTCOMM) approached the YPG. Turkey-US relations began showing signs of deterioration, particularly over the handling over the YPG. The American forces in the Syrian Civil War openly allied with the Kurdish YPG fighters and supported them militarily. The YPG was criticized by Turkey for its alleged support to the PKK, especially since a rebellion in southern Turkey began in 2015. By early 2015, voices in the US foreign policy establishment pushed to abandon the rebels. In early October 2015, shortly after the start of the Russian military intervention in Syria, Obama was reported to have authorized the resupply of 25,000 YPG militia. Erdoğan stated that he had asked Obama not to intervene on the side of the YPG: "I told Mr. Obama, 'Don't drop those bombs [meaning weapons and other supplies]. You will be making a mistake.' Unfortunately, despite our conversation, they dropped whatever was needed with three C-130's and half of it landed in [IS'] hands. So who is supplying [ISIL], then?" Erdogan also opposed any arrangements in Syria that would mirror the Iraqi Kurds' de facto state in northern Syria. He told reporters on January 26, 2015: "What is this? Northern Iraq? Now [they want] Northern Syria to be born. It is impossible for us to accept this. ... Such entities will cause great problems in the future." According to General Raymond A. Thomas (at the time head of the United States Special Operations Command (USSOCOM)) at the Aspen Security Forum in July 2017, the SDF (established October 10, 2015) is a PR-friendly name for the YPG, which Thomas personally suggested because the YPG is considered an arm of the PKK. On February 1, 2016, Brett McGurk officially visited SDF commander Ferhat Abdi Şahin (also known as General Mazloum Kobani), after the Siege of Kobanî. In response, Erdoğan said: “How can we trust you? Is it me that is your partner or is it the terrorists in Kobani?” After Kobani, General Allen and Brett McGurk worked on Tal Abyad. Turkey did not permit flying off of a Turkish airbase. McGurk said: "So the picture that developed while General Allen and I were spending most of these months in Ankara is that something was not on the level [in fighting against Turkey's enemy ISIL, U.S. allied with Turkey's enemy]." Turkey overtly defied American orders of ceasing Turkey's military bombardment of the YPG fighters in their bid to take the town of Azaz in northern Syria. Signs of strain were then displayed when Obama refused to have a formal meeting with Erdoğan when the latter visited the United States in March 2016.

Gülen movement (coup d'état attempt & extradition) 

After the failed coup attempt in July 2016, Turkey demanded that the United States government extradite Fethullah Gülen, a cleric and Turkish national living in the U.S. state of Pennsylvania. However, the US government demanded that Turkey first produce evidence that he was connected with the coup attempt. Due to perceptions that former US Secretary of State and Democratic Party presidential nominee Hillary Clinton is friendly towards the Gülen movement, many Erdoğan supporters reportedly favored Republican Party presidential nominee Donald Trump in the United States' 2016 presidential election.

In a speech on July 29, 2016, President Erdoğan accused CENTCOM chief Joseph Votel of "siding with coup plotters" after Votel accused the Turkish government of arresting the Pentagon's contacts in Turkey. Yeni Şafak, a Turkish pro-government newspaper, claimed that the former commander of NATO forces in Afghanistan, now-retired U.S. Army General John F. Campbell, was the "mastermind" behind the coup attempt in Turkey. In late July 2016, Turkish prime minister Binali Yıldırım told The Guardian: "Of course, since the leader of this terrorist organisation is residing in the United States, there are question marks in the minds of the people whether there is any U.S. involvement or backing.  On 19 July, an official request had been sent to the US for the extradition of Fethullah Gülen. Senior U.S. officials said this evidence pertained to certain pre-coup alleged subversive activities.

Trump administration (2017–2021) 

The Turkish government had a generally warm relationship with the Trump administration, backing the Trump administration's stance against Antifa groups during the George Floyd protests and condemning restrictions placed on Trump's social media accounts as "digital fascism".

Qatar (diplomatic crisis) 

Turkey supported Qatar in its diplomatic confrontation with a Saudi and Emirati-led bloc of countries that severed ties with and imposed sanctions on Qatar on June 5, 2017. Erdoğan criticized the list of demands released by the countries on 22 June, stating that they undermine Qatar's sovereignty.

In December 2017, US national security advisor General H.R. McMaster said that Turkey had joined Qatar as a prime source of funding that contributes to the spread of extremist ideology of Islamism: "We're seeing great involvement by Turkey from everywhere from western Africa to Southeast Asia, funding groups that help create the conditions that allow terrorism to flourish."

Saudi Arabia (Khashoggi) 
The assassination of Jamal Khashoggi, a Saudi dissident, journalist for The Washington Post, and former general manager and editor-in-chief of Al-Arab News Channel, occurred on October 2, 2018, at the Saudi consulate in Istanbul, Turkey, and was perpetrated by agents of the Saudi Arabian government. Government officials of Turkey believe Khashoggi was murdered with premeditation. Anonymous Saudi officials have admitted that agents affiliated with the Saudi government killed him.

CIA Director Gina Haspel traveled to Turkey to address the investigation. Haspel's visit came before a planned speech by Erdoğan. She listened to audio purportedly capturing the sound of saw on a bone. On November 20, US President Donald Trump rejected the CIA's conclusion that Crown Prince Mohammed bin Salman had ordered the killing. He issued a statement saying "it could very well be that the Crown Prince had knowledge of this tragic event — maybe he did and maybe he didn't" and that "in any case, [their] relationship is with the Kingdom of Saudi Arabia".

Air Defense System (Russian S-400) 

After Turkey acquired the Russian S-400 missile system, the United States decided to end the F-35 deal before July 31, 2019. Acting Defense Secretary Patrick M. Shanahan had warned Turkey that such a deal with Russia risks undermining its ties to NATO. The US threatened Turkey with CAATSA sanctions over Turkey's decision to buy the S-400 missile defense system from Russia. In February 2019, Russia had an advance supply contract with Saudi Arabia for the S-400, Qatar was in “advanced” talks with Russia for the S-400, and India agreed to pay more than $5 billion for five S-400 squadrons to be delivered in 2023.

On July 22, 2019, Turkey claimed to retaliate against the “unacceptable” threat of US sanctions over Turkey's purchase of Russian S-400 missile defenses.

In December 2020, one month after Trump lost the presidential election, the Trump government imposed sanctions targeting Turkey's Defence Industries Directorate, its president and three employees.

Syrian Civil War (refugees, Barisha raid) 

The Trump travel ban actions include two executive orders for restrictions on citizens of seven (first executive order) or six (second executive order) Muslim-majority countries.  A third action, done by presidential proclamation, restricts entry to the U.S. by citizens from eight countries, six of which are predominantly Muslim. During and after his election campaign Trump proposed establishing safe zones in Syria as an alternative to Syrian refugees' immigration to the US. In the past, "safe zones" have been interpreted as establishing, among other things, no-fly zones over Syria. During the Obama administration Turkey encouraged the U.S. to establish safe zones; the Obama administration was concerned about the potential for pulling the U.S. into a war with Russia. In the first few weeks of Trump's presidency, Turkey renewed its call for safe zones and proposed a new plan for them. The Trump administration spoke with several other Sunni Arab States regarding safe zones, and Russia has asked for clarification regarding any Trump administration plan regarding safe zones.

The Turkey migrant crisis in the 2010s was characterized by high numbers of people arriving in Turkey. As reported by UNHCR in 2018, Turkey is hosting 63.4% of all the refugees (from Middle East, Africa, and Afghanistan) in the world. As of 2019, refugees of the Syrian Civil War in Turkey (3.6 million) numbered highest as "registered" refugees (2011–2018: 30 billion on refugee assistance). As the war made the return of refugees to Syria uncertain, Turkey focused on how to manage their presence in Turkish society by addressing their legal status, basic needs, employment, education, and impact on local communities.

According to two anonymous American officials, the Central Intelligence Agency obtained original intelligence on Baghdadi following the arrests of one of his wives and a courier. The arrest of al-Baghdadi's top aide Ismael al-Ethawi was the key: al-Ethawi was found and followed by informants in Syria, apprehended by Turkish authorities, and handed over to the Iraqi intelligence to whom he provided information in February 2018. In 2019, US, Turkish, and Iraqi intelligence conducted a joint operation in which they captured several senior ISIL leaders who provided the locations where they met with Baghdadi inside Syria. According to Voice of America, the fate of al-Baghdadi "was sealed by the capture of his aide". Turkish and US military authorities exchanged and coordinated information ahead of the attack in Barisha, Harem District, Idlib Governorate, Syria. President Trump thanked Russia, Turkey, Syria, and Iraq for aiding US operation and praised Erdoğan, claiming that he is "a big fan", a "friend of [his]" and "a hell of a leader."

Gülen movement (Flynn - Brunson - Visa & Tariff) 
Michael Flynn's consulting company was hired by Inovo BV, a company owned by Kamil Ekim Alptekin. Alptekin also chairs the Turkish-American Business Council, an arm of the Foreign Economic Relations Board of Turkey (DEIK). On November 8, 2016 (election day in the United States), The Hill published an op-ed by Flynn in which he called for the US to back Erdoğan's government and alleged that the regime's opponent, Pennsylvania-based opposition cleric Fethullah Gülen, headed a "vast global network" that fit "the description of a dangerous sleeper terror network".

Pastor Andrew Brunson was charged with terrorism and espionage during the purges that followed the 2016 Turkish coup d'état attempt against Erdoğan. Serkan Golge, a naturalized US citizen, was jailed in Turkey for three years on charges of participating in terrorism and conspiring against the government as a member of the Gülen movement. Metin Topuz, a US consulate employee, was charged with having links to Gülen and was arrested under "terror charges" by an Istanbul court. Topuz was the second US government employee in Turkey to be arrested in 2017. The United States suspended all non-immigrant visas from Turkey "indefinitely" due to Topuz's arrest. Turkey retaliated against the US with suspensions of all US visas, including tourist visas, shortly after the US State Department made their announcement.

On August 1, 2018, the US Department of Treasury imposed sanctions on top Turkish government officials who were involved in the detention of Brunson. Daniel Glaser, the former Treasury official under Obama, said: "It's certainly the first time I can think of" the U.S. sanctioning a NATO ally. On August 10, 2018, Trump imposed punitive tariffs against Turkey after an impasse over Brunson's imprisonment and other issues. The move prompted Erdoğan to say that the United States was "[ex]changing a strategic NATO partner for a pastor" and that the US' behavior would force Turkey to look for new friends and allies. The presidential spokesperson of Turkish President, İbrahim Kalın, tweeted that the US is losing Turkey, and that the entire Turkish public is against U.S. policies. In addition, the Uşak Province decided to stop running digital advertisement on United States-based social media platforms like Facebook, Google, Instagram, Twitter, and YouTube, canceling all of their ads as a response to US sanctions on Turkey. Turkey went on to say that it would retaliate against the raising of steel and aluminium tariffs by the U.S. administration (The US had already imposed 10 percent and 25 percent additional tariffs on aluminum and steel imports respectively from all countries on March 23, 2018, but on August 13, 2018, it added additional tariffs on steel imports from Turkey). Erdoğan said that Turkey will boycott electronic products from the US, using iPhones as an example. The Keçiören Municipality in the Ankara decided not to issue business licenses to American brands including McDonald's, Starbucks and Burger King. In addition, Turkey decided to increase tariffs on imports of a range of US products, and on August 20, 2018, there were gunshots at the USA Embassy in Ankara. No casualties were reported and Turkish authorities detained two men suspects.

In August 2020, Democratic presidential nominee Joe Biden called for a new U.S. approach to the "autocrat" President Erdoğan and support for Turkish opposition parties.

Armenian genocide 

In 2019, the United States Congress, with sponsors from Saudi Arabia, issued official recognition of the Armenian genocide, which was the first time the United States has officially acknowledged the genocide, having previously only unofficially or partially recognized the genocide. Turkey, which has traditionally denied that such genocide existed, blasted the United States for inflaming tensions. Donald Trump has rejected the resolution by Congress, citing that his administration's stance on the issue had not changed.

Hamas and Israel 

On the same time, relations between Turkey and the United States also worsened after the Turkish government hosted two Hamas leaders, in a move that was believed to be in response to the Abraham Accord, in which Israel normalized relations with the United Arab Emirates and Bahrain; the Abraham Accord was opposed by Ankara. Relations between Turkey and Israel, a major ally of the United States, have already gone low.

Nagorno-Karabakh war 

Presidential candidate and former Vice President Joe Biden demanded that Turkey "stay out" of the Nagorno-Karabakh conflict between Azerbaijan and Armenia, in which Turkey has supported the Azeris. Eliot Engel, chairman of the House Foreign Affairs Committee, called the influence of third party actors like Turkey "troubling". In a letter to Secretary of State Pompeo, Senate Foreign Relations Committee ranking member Bob Menendez, Senate Minority Leader Chuck Schumer, and several other lawmakers called for the Trump administration to "immediately suspend all sales and transfers of military equipment to Ankara." As for the result, relations between the United States to Turkey and Azerbaijan further worsened, with Turkey accused the United States of sending weapons and supplies to Armenia, which Washington denied.

On 15 October 2020, Secretary of State Mike Pompeo urged both sides to respect the humanitarian ceasefire and stated, "We now have the Turks, who have stepped in and provided resources to Azerbaijan, increasing the risk, increasing the firepower that's taking place in this historic fight."

Sanctions
On 8 December 2020, the House of Representatives approved a sanctions package against Turkey due to its purchase of S-400 missile system from Russia. Trump administration said that the president will veto the bill. Trump had earlier worked to delay passing sanctions against Turkey, but he lost the 2020 United States presidential election. On 14 December, 2020, the United States imposed the sanctions on Turkey, and the sanctions included a ban on all U.S. export licenses and authorizations to SSB and an asset freeze and visa restrictions on Dr. Ismail Demir, SSB's president, and other SSB officers. The United States also excluded Turkey from the joint F-35 project, as well as barred Turkey from approaching new NATO technological development. Subsequently, doubts were raised by a number of international policy analysts that military sanctions on the NATO ally would weaken the alliance, effectively reducing Turkey's ability to obtain American technology for regional defense. For this reason, the incoming Biden administration would likely hold off on sanctions to normalize relations.

Clashes at the Turkish Ambassador's Residence in Washington, D.C.

On May 16, 2017, clashes broke out between Turkey's Police Counter Attack Team and a crowd of protesters outside the Turkish Ambassador's residence in Washington, D.C. 24 men were filmed attacking protesters, with some protesters being kicked while curled in the fetal position as Erdogan looked on. Many of the charges have been dropped, but civil lawsuits are ongoing as of January 2021.

Biden administration (2021–present) 

On April 24, 2021, Armenian Genocide Remembrance Day, President Joe Biden referred to the massacre of the Armenians during the Ottoman Empire in 1915 as "genocide" in a statement released by the White House. Turkey has long practiced a policy of denial against the Armenian Genocide, and Biden's move was refuted by President Erdogan as "groundless" and opening a "deep wound" in U.S.-Turkey relations. 

In October 2021, in the wake of the appeal for the release of Turkish activist Osman Kavala signed by 10 western countries, Turkish president Recep Tayyip Erdoğan ordered his foreign minister to declare the US ambassador persona non grata, alongside the other 9 ambassadors. However, the ambassadors did not receive any formal notice to leave the country and Erdoğan eventually stepped back.

On March 5, 2022, the Turkish Foreign Ministry stated after discussions with NATO partners' deputy foreign ministers that Turkey and the US will continue to work in "tight coordination" to find a diplomatic solution to Russia's invasion of Ukraine.

On March 19, 2022, the US has broached the unlikely option of delivering its Russian-made S-400 missile defence systems to Ukraine to assist it in fighting invading Russian forces, According to three sources acquainted with the situation.

On May 22, 2022, after the US embassy issued a warning that police might respond violently to an opposition gathering in Istanbul, Turkey's foreign relations ministry summoned Ambassador Jeff Flake.
On June 28, 2022, US President Joe Biden thanked Turkey for the Finland-Sweden-Turkey trilateral memorandum at the NATO 2022 Madrid summit.

Economic relations 

The United States and Turkey are both members in the Organisation for Economic Co-operation and Development (OECD) and the G-20. The US and Turkey have had a Joint Economic Commission and a Trade and Investment Framework Agreement for several years. In 2002, the two countries indicated their joint intent to upgrade bilateral economic relations by launching an Economic Partnership Commission.

Turkey is currently the 32nd-largest goods trading partner with $20.5 billion in total ($10.2 billion; imports $10.3 billion) goods trade during 2018. US' goods and services trade with Turkey totaled an estimated $24.0 billion (exports: $12.7 billion; imports: $11.2 billion) in 2017. The trade deficit was $143 million in 2018.

The US exports of goods and services to Turkey involved 68,000 jobs in 2015.

Military relations 
For the Anatolian Falcon 2012 joint exercises, the United States sent the 480th Fighter Squadron to train with Turkish pilots in the operation Suppression of Enemy Air Defenses.

Joint operations 

Turkey participated with the United States in the Korean War in 1950–53 and in missions in Somalia, Kosovo, and Bosnia and Herzegovina in 1992–2004.

Turkey has commanded the International Security Assistance Force (ISAF) in Afghanistan twice since its inception. 2,000 Mehmetçik concentrated on training Afghan military and security forces and provided security at ISAF's Regional Command-Capital stationed in Kabul. An undisclosed number of Mehmetçik were deployed to the Wardak and Jawzjan provinces to give ground support to USA Air Force Operations.

During the Iraq War, Turkey established the NATO Training Mission in 2005 and sponsored specialized training for hundreds of Iraqi security personnel in a secret facility in Turkey.

Operation Gladio 
Operation Gladio is the codename for a clandestine "stay-behind" operation of armed resistance that was planned by the Western Union (WU) (and subsequently by NATO) for a potential Warsaw Pact invasion and conquest in Europe.

Counter-Guerrilla is the branch of the operation. The operation's founding goal was to erect a guerrilla force capable of countering a possible Soviet invasion. The goal was soon expanded to subverting communism in Turkey. Counter-Guerrilla initially operated out of the Turkish Armed Forces' Tactical Mobilization Group (STK). In 1967, it was renamed to the Special Warfare Department before becoming Special Forces Command. Counter-Guerrilla's existence in Turkey was revealed in 1973 by then-prime minister Bülent Ecevit.

Cooperation 
The United States and Turkey share membership in NATO, the Organization for Security and Co-operation in Europe (OSCE), and continue to cooperate in important projects, such as the Joint Strike Fighter program.

Bases and logistics 

Since 1954, Turkey has hosted the Incirlik Air Base, an important operations base of the United States Air Force, which has played a critical role during the Cold War, the Gulf War, and the Iraq War. Turkey routinely hosts the United States for Anatolian Falcon and (with Israel, before their relationship worsened) Anatolian Eagle exercises held at its Konya airbase.

Turkish bases and transport corridors have been used heavily for military operations in Iraq, Afghanistan, and Libya as of 2011.

In the 2016 Turkish coup d'état attempt, some of the planes used at the operation and a fueling carrier took off from Incirlik base; in response, the Turkish government arrested several high-ranking Turkish military officers at Incirlik and cut power to the base for nearly a week.

Nuclear warheads 
Turkey hosts U.S. controlled nuclear weapons as part of nuclear sharing policy. Its current arsenal is B61 nuclear bomb, while it formerly held MGR-1 Honest John, MIM-14 Nike Hercules, PGM-19 Jupiter, W33 and W48 artillery shells.

Turkey does not have dedicated nuclear-capable fighter aircraft that can deliver the weapons and does not train its pilots to fly nuclear missions.

Industrial cooperation 

The defense industry of Turkey is growing. Turkey's 240 Lockheed Martin General Dynamics F-16 Fighting Falcons were co-produced in Turkey by one of Turkish Aerospace Industries' predecessors (TAI). The United States and Turkey signed an FMS contract in 2009 for 30 F-16 Block 50s to be co-produced by TAI.

Turkey reportedly wanted to purchase drone aircraft from the United States to assist in its counterterrorism efforts against the PKK before its request was denied. Turkey produced Bayraktar Tactical UAS.

F-35s 
Turkey is one of eight countries—along with the United Kingdom, Canada, Netherlands, Italy, Denmark, Norway, and Australia—partnering with the United States on the F-35 Joint Strike Fighter program. Turkey plans to purchase up to 116 F-35s, 90 for delivery over an estimated 10-year period (2014–2023), that are jointly assembled and/or developed by firms from the various JSF partners. The cost is estimated to be at least $11 billion and could exceed $15 billion, given continued cost inflation on the program. The Pentagon decided to end the F-35 deal by July 31, 2019, as a result of Turkey, as a NATO partner, purchasing S400 missiles from Russia.

Alleged cable leaks highlighted Turkish concerns that upgrades to General Dynamics F-16 Fighting Falcons had "precluded Turkish access to computer systems and
software modification previously allowed".

Radar and signal analysis 
To have the Terminal High Altitude Area Defense be approved, Turkey received two conditions: Iran or Syria should not be named as a threat to Turkey, and Turkey's territory was to be protected by the system (as a national defense requirement). According to U.S. officials, the AN/TPY-2 radar was deployed at Turkey's Kürecik Air Force base and activated in January 2012.

Military aid

U.S. equipment in Turkey 
Regional problems in the 1960s, Cyprus crises in 1963 and 1967, Cyprus invasion in 1974, and the arms embargo by the US in 1975–1978 following the invasion necessitated Turkey developing a defense industry based on national resources.

Milestones 
 1954: United States and Turkey sign first status of forces agreement.
 1980: US–Turkey Defense and Economic Cooperation Agreement.
 1999: PKK leader Abdullah Ocalan captured MIT/Pentagon operation;
 2003: Turkish Parliament denies invasion (ground forces) of Iraq from Turkey and permits use of Turkish bases for overflight
 2003: U.S. detain Turkish special forces troops in Suleimaniyah, Iraq.
 2011: "Operation Unified Protector”.

State and official visits

1999 Clinton visit 

President Bill Clinton visited Ankara, İzmit, Ephesus, and Istanbul November 15–19, 1999. It was a State visit where he also attended the Organization for Security and Cooperation's Europe Summit meeting.

2009 Obama visit 
 

Relations between Turkey and the United States markedly improved during the Obama administration's first term, but the two countries were nevertheless unable to reach their ambitious goals. Obama made his first official visit to Turkey at Ankara and Istanbul April 6–7, 2009. There US critics who claimed that Turkey should not be rewarded by an early presidential visit as its government had been systematically reorienting foreign policy onto an Islamist axis. Former U.S. Ambassador to Turkey Mark Parris remarked: “Whatever the merits of this argument, the Obama administration, by scheduling the visit, have decisively rejected it.”

During his visit, Obama urged Turkey to come to terms with its past and resolve its Armenian issues. During the 2008 US presidential election, he had criticized former US President George W. Bush for his failure to take a stance and stated that the "Armenian genocide is not an allegation, a personal opinion, or a point of view, but rather a widely documented fact supported by an overwhelming body of historical evidence". He responded positively to an announcement from sources in Ankara and Yerevan that a deal to reopen the border between the two states and exchange diplomatic personnel would happen, and indicated that although his own personal views on the subject remained unchanged, to avoid derailing this diplomatic progress, he would from using the word "genocide" in his upcoming April 24 speech on the question.

Turkish President Gül later referred to the visit as “evidence of a vital partnership between Turkey and the US,” whilst Turkish Foreign Minister Ahmet Davutoğlu pointed out that they were "changing the psychological atmosphere” of what was before “seen as a military relationship”. Obama clarified: “We are not solely strategic partners, we are also model partners.” With this change in terminology, “The President wanted to stress the uniqueness of this relationship. This is not an ordinary relationship, it's a prototype and unique relationship.” A US House Committee on Foreign Affairs hearing, The United States and Turkey: A Model Partnership, chaired by Head of the Subcommittee on Europe Robert Wexler was convened after “the historic visit that Obama paid to Turkey”, and concluded that "this cooperation is vital for both of the two states in an environment in which we face serious security issues in Afghanistan, Iraq, Iran, the Balkans, Black Sea, Caucuses and the Middle East, besides a global financial crisis”.

After Obama's visit, Turkish Prime Minister Recep Tayyip Erdoğan and Chief of the Turkish General Staff İlker Başbuğ hosted US Chairman of the Joint Chiefs of Staff Admiral Mike Mullen in Ankara. During the closed-door meeting, they discussed the pledging of further Turkish support troops to Afghanistan and Pakistan where Turkish authorities have influence, the secure transport of troops and equipment from the port of İskenderun during the withdrawal of U.S. troops from Iraq, and the pro-Kurdish terrorists operating in south-eastern Turkey and northern Iraq.

On April 22, 2009, shortly after Obama's visit, Turkish and Armenian authorities formally announced a provisional roadmap for the normalization of diplomatic ties between the two states. The U.S. responded positively with a statement from the office of U.S. Vice President Joe Biden following a phone conversation with Armenian President Serzh Sargsyan, which stated that “the Vice President applauded President Sargsyan's leadership, and underscored the administration's support for both Armenia and Turkey in this process”. Turkish columnists, however, criticized the timing of the announcement, and believed it to have been made to placate the Obama in advance of his April 24 speech, with Fikret Bila writing in the Milliyet that “the Turkish Foreign Ministry made this statement regarding the roadmap before midnight”, as it would allow Obama to go back on his campaign promise to refer to the incident as genocide, which the Turkish government profusely denied, by pointing out to the Armenian diaspora that “Turkey reached a consensus with Armenia and set a roadmap” and “there is no need now to damage this process”.

2013 Erdoğan visit 
 

In May 2013, Erdoğan visited the White House and met with Obama, who said the visit was an opportunity "to return the extraordinary hospitality that the Prime Minister and the Turkish people showed [him] on [his] visit to Turkey four years ago". During their joint press conference, both Obama and Erdoğan stressed the importance of achieving stability in Syria. Erdoğan said that during his time with Obama, "Syria was at the top of [their] agenda" and Obama repeated the United States plan to support the Assad-opposition while applying "steady international pressure". When they were not discussing national security threats, Obama and Erdoğan discussed expanding economic relations between the two countries; Turkey had received over $50 billion in foreign investments, $20 billion of which came from the United States. In 2003, there was only $8 billion in U.S. investment in Turkey; both Erdoğan and Obama praised this recent increase and agreed to continue expanding the trade and investment agreements between the two countries. Erdoğan's visit culminated with talks of stability in the region. Obama stressed the importance of normalizing relations between Turkey and Israel and praised the steps Erdoğan had taken in that process. The process normalizing the Turkish-Israeli relationship had begun and Erdoğan stated that he would continue this process: "We don't need any other problems, issues in the region."

2019 Erdoğan visit 

In November 2019, Erdogan visited the White House and held meetings with U.S. President Donald Trump.

List

Cultural relations
The 1978 American semi-biographical film Midnight Express was banned in Turkey under Article 301 of the Turkish Penal Code, which caused a strain on US–Turkish relations.

In late 2007, Turkey recalled its ambassador to the United States after the US House Committee on Foreign Affairs passed a US resolution on the Armenian genocide in the Ottoman Empire, which resulted in a delay of a full House vote on Resolution 106. Speaker Nancy Pelosi pledged to bring the resolution to a full vote, but pressure from the White House and Turkey kept her from doing so.

American international schools in Turkey
 Bursa American College for Girls (1854–1928)
 Robert College (founded 1863), in Istanbul
 Talas American College (1871–1968), in Talas
 Üsküdar American Academy (founded 1876), in Istanbul
 American Collegiate Institute (founded 1878), in  İzmir
 Anatolia College in Merzifon (1886–1924)

Turkish schools in the United States
Around 120 Gülen charter schools operate within the United States.

Embassies 
The Embassy of the United States is located in Ankara, Turkey, while the Embassy of Turkey is located in Washington, D.C., United States.

See also
 Foreign relations of Turkey
 Foreign relations of the United States
 Turkish invasion of Cyprus
 Conspiracy theories in Turkey
 Clashes at the Turkish Ambassador's Residence in Washington, D.C. 
 United States recognition of the Armenian Genocide
 Turks in the United States
Turkish House
 Turkey–European Union relations
 Russia–Turkey relations

References

Further reading

 Aslan, Omer. The United States and Military Coups in Turkey and Pakistan (Palgrave Macmillan, 2018). online
 Athanassopoulou, Ekavi. Strategic Relations between the US and Turkey 1979-2000: Sleeping with a Tiger (Routledge, 2014).

 Baran, Zeyno (May 11, 2005) “The State of U.S.-Turkey Relations”, United States House Committee on Foreign Affairs, Subcommittee on Europe and Emerging Threats. 
 Barlas, Dilek, and Şuhnaz Yilmaz. "Managing the transition from Pax Britannica to Pax Americana: Turkey's relations with Britain and the US in a turbulent era (1929–47)." Turkish Studies (2016): 1-25.
 Brands, H.W., Jr. "America Enters the Cyprus Tangle 1964," Middle Eastern Studies 23#3 (1987), pp. 348–362.
 Camp, Glen D. "Greek-Turkish Conflict over Cyprus." Political Science Quarterly 95.1 (1980) 95#1: 43–70. online
 Coufoudakis, Van. "Turkey and the United States: The Problems and Prospects of a Post-War Alliance." JPMS: Journal of Political and Military Sociology 9.2 (1981): 179–196.
 Harris, George Sellers, and Bilge Criss, eds. Studies in Atatürk's Turkey: the American dimension (Brill, 2009).
 Howard, Harry N. "The bicentennial in American-Turkish relations." Middle East Journal 30.3 (1976): 291–310. online
 
 Karpat, Kemal H., ed. Turkey's Foreign Policy in Transition 1950-1974 (Leiden, Brill, 1975)
 Kubilay Yado Arin: The AKP's Foreign Policy, Turkey's Reorientation from the West to the East? Wissenschaftlicher Verlag Berlin, Berlin 2013. ISBN 9 783865 737199.
 Kuniholm, Bruce R. "Turkey and NATO: Past, Present and Future," ORBIS (Summer 1983 27#2, pp. 421–445.
 Kunihoim, Bruce R. The Origins of the Cold War in the Near East: Great Power Conflict and Diplomacy in Iran, Turkey and Greece (Princeton UP, 1980)
 Laipson, Helen. "US Policy towards Greece and Turkey since 1974." in The Greek-Turkish Conflict in the 1990s (Palgrave Macmillan, 1991) pp. 164-182.

 Laipson, Ellen B. "Cyprus: A Quarter Century of U.S. Diplomacy." in John T.A. Koumouljdes,(ed.), Cyprus in Transition 1960-1985 (London: Trigraph, 1986).
 McGhee, George. The U.S. - Turkish- NATO- Middle East Connection: How the Truman Doctrine and Turkey's NATO Entry Contained the Soviets (Macmillan, 1990).
 Magalhaes, Margaux. "Congress and US-Turkey relations." Journal of Transatlantic Studies 19.4 (2021): 494-516.

  
 Simavoryan, Arestakes. (2020). The Controversy of Ankara-Washington under Trump. https://orbeli.am/en/post/483/2020-06-29/The+Controversy+of+Ankara-Washington+under+Trump
  Nash, Philip. The Other Missiles of October: Eisenhower, Kennedy, and the Jupiters, 1957-1963 (1997) online
 Olson, Robert W., Nurhan Ince, and Nuhan Ince. "Turkish Foreign Policy from 1923-1960: Kemalism and Its Legacy, a Review and a Critique." Oriente Moderno 57.5/6 (1977): 227–241. in JSTOR
 Sanberk, Özdem. "The Importance of Trust Building in Foreign Policy, a Case Study: The Trajectory of the Turkish-American Relations." Review of International Law and Politics 12 (2016): 13+
 Rustow, Dankwart A. Turkey: America's Forgotten Ally (Council on Foreign Relations, 1987).
 Seydi, SÜleyman. “Turkish—American Relations and the Cuban Missile Crisis, 1957-63.” Middle Eastern Studies 46#3 (2010), pp. 433–455. online
 Stearns, Monteagle. Entangled Allies: U.S. Policy Toward Greece, Turkey and Cyprus (Council on Foreign Relations Press, 1992).
 Thomas, Lewis V. and Frye, Richard N. The United States and Turkey and Iran (Harvard University Press, 1951).
 Trask, Roger R. The United States response to Turkish nationalism and reform, 1914-1939 (U of Minnesota Press, 1971).
 Trask, Roger R. "The" Terrible Turk" and Turkish-American Relations in the Interwar Period." Historian 33.1 (1970): 40-53 online covers chapter 4.
 Uslu, Nasuh. "Turkey's relationship with the United States 1960-1975". (PhD Diss. Durham University, 1994) online
 Uslu, Nasuh. The Cyprus question as an issue of Turkish foreign policy and Turkish-American relations, 1959-2003 (Nova Publishers, 2003).
 Uslu, Nasuh. The Turkish-American relationship between 1947 and 2003: The history of a distinctive alliance ( Nova Publishers, 2003).
 Yilmaz, Şuhnaz. Turkish-American Relations, 1800-1952: Between the Stars, Stripes and the Crescent (Routledge, 2015).
 Yilmaz, Şuhnaz. "Challenging the stereotypes: Turkish–American relations in the inter-war era." Middle Eastern Studies 42.2 (2006): 223–237.

External links
U.S. Department of State Background Note: Turkey
U.S. Embassy in Turkey
, ASAM
Örmeci, Ozan & Işıksal, Hüseyin (2020), Historical Examinations and Current Issues in Turkish-American Relations, Berlin: Peter Lang

 
United States
Bilateral relations of the United States
Articles containing video clips